Thaïs Henríquez (born 29 October 1982) is a Spanish synchronized swimmer. She competed for Spain in the team event at the 2008 Summer Olympics, winning silver, and the 2012 Summer Olympics, winning bronze.

References

 Olympic profile  london2012.com

Spanish synchronized swimmers
Synchronized swimmers at the 2008 Summer Olympics
Synchronized swimmers at the 2012 Summer Olympics
Olympic synchronized swimmers of Spain
Olympic silver medalists for Spain
Living people
Olympic medalists in synchronized swimming
1982 births
Olympic bronze medalists for Spain
Medalists at the 2012 Summer Olympics
Medalists at the 2008 Summer Olympics
World Aquatics Championships medalists in synchronised swimming
Synchronized swimmers at the 2013 World Aquatics Championships
Synchronized swimmers at the 2007 World Aquatics Championships
Synchronized swimmers at the 2005 World Aquatics Championships
Synchronized swimmers at the 2009 World Aquatics Championships
Synchronized swimmers at the 2011 World Aquatics Championships